Vehari also spelled Vihari, is a city and the headquarters of Vehari District in the Punjab province of Pakistan. It is Pakistan's 62nd largest city. Vehari is located at the Multan-Delhi Road constructed by Indian Muslim Emperor Sher Shah Suri.

Location
Islam Headworks is on this river near Luddan on the Luddan-Vehari canal providing irrigation water to both banks of the river, which includes the upper fringes of the Cholistan Desert.

Agriculture
Vehari is known to be a city of cotton, among other crops. Vehari has dozens of cotton processing factories and cottonseed oil manufacturing plants; sugarcane farming and processing is also common. Agricultural products include mangoes in the summer and guava and other citrus fruits orange  in the winter.

The summer in Vehari is extremely hot; the weather became pleasant during October and February but in recent years it has been reduced to barely three months from December to February. During the summers, temperature hit 45 to 50 degree Celsius on a regular basis. The rainfall is very light throughout the year in Vehari. Recent years have seen Vehari struggle for rainfall even during the usually busy monsoon season. When rainfall is light rainfall the land is generally arid and dusty.

History
Vehari district was created in 1976 when it was cut off from Multan district. Vehari District was an agricultural region with forests during the Indus Valley civilization. The Vedic period is characterized by Indo-Aryan. The Abhira / Ahir, Kambojas, Daradas, Kaikayas, Madras, Pauravas, Yaudheyas, Malavas and Kurus invaded, settled and ruled ancient Punjab region. After overrunning the Achaemenid Empire in 331 BCE, Alexander marched into present-day Punjab region with an army of 50,000. The Vehari was ruled by Maurya Empire, Indo-Greek kingdom, Kushan Empire, Gupta Empire, White Huns, Kushano-Hephthalites and the Turk and Hindu Shahi kingdoms.

In 997 CE, Sultan Mahmud Ghaznavi, took over the Ghaznavid dynasty empire established by his father, Sultan Sebuktegin. In 1005, he conquered the Shahis in Kabul and followed it by the conquests of Punjab region. The Delhi Sultanate and later Mughal Empire ruled the region.

After the decline of the Mughal Empire, the Sikhs invaded and occupied Vehari District. During the period of British rule, Vehari district increased in population and importance.

Vehari District is the result of construction of the Pakpattan canal from Sulemanki Head Works on the Sutlej and the institution of Nili Bar colony project in 1925, so called because of the hints of blue in the water of the Sutlej. The ancient history of the district is obscure. The populated areas in ancient times was restricted to the banks of the river Sutlej where seasonal inundation permitted some cultivation. The rest of the area was a vast sandy scrap-land at best affording pastures itinerant herdsmen. The riparian tract formed the state of Fatehpur during the time of Akbar the Great. This was ruled by Fateh Khan of Joya family who founded and gave his name to the town of Fatehpur. (Fatehpur is still in existence about 15 kilometres to the south of Mailsi and is the oldest town of Mailsi subdivision. It has some remains of archaeological value.)

The predominantly Muslim population supported Muslim League and Pakistan Movement. After the independence of Pakistan in 1947, the minority Hindus and Sikhs migrated to India while the Muslim refugees from India settled in the Vehari District.

The main castes in Vehari are Rao Rajput, Jatt, Dhudhi-Rajput, Joyia-Rajput, Sheikh, Bhatti-Rajput, Baloch, Khokhars, Daha, Gujjar, Aheer, Arian, Sial, Awan, Langrial.

Education

City has two full-fledged university campuses and two post-graduate colleges for men and women. COMSATS University, Vehari Campus is offering MS and BS programs since 2009.
Virtual University Campus is working at Vehari since 2001. The city contains many higher secondary schools and private colleges. Education University is a government-funded and operated campus with more than four faculties and many departments. COMSATS University, Vehari Campus is public sector university funded by ministry of Science and Technology. Pakistan's leading university, University of Agriculture Faisalabad (UAF), Bahaudin Zikriya University Multan, University of Education and Allama Iqbal Open University has a sub-campus in Vehari.

Transport

Vehari is on the southern alternate route of railway and road between Multan and Lahore, the capital of the province.

The northern route is the main route. Both run roughly in a northeasterly direction, almost parallel to each other and only 20 to 30 miles apart at any point. A section of the railway between Multan and Lahore was electrified on the main line between Khanewal and Lahore during the 1960s; however, in subsequent decades and lately with rapid decline and deterioration of the infrastructure of Pakistan Railway (PR), the electrified section lies in ruins and is not likely to be restored in the foreseeable future. With the new motorway between Multan and Lahore which was due to be completed sometimes in the early part of 2014, Vehari is set to benefit from its proximity to its north.

Culture

The Vehari route goes to Lahore through the religiously renowned city of Pakpattan, where the Sufi saint Fariduddin Ganjshakar is buried. Thousands of pilgrims come annually to Pakpattan for the saint's Urs celebration which include all sorts of festivities. Selections from his work are included in the Guru Granth Sahib, the Sikh sacred scripture. He was commonly known as "Baba Farid". Power Radio FM 99 has a station for Vehari.

Climate
The climate of the district is hot and dry in summer and cold in winter Amin et al. (2017). The maximum and minimum temperature ranges between 45 °C and 28 °C in summer. During winter, the temperature fluctuates between 21 °C and 5 °C.

Notable personalities
 Waqar Younis, former Pakistan Cricket Team player and head coach
 Saleem Sherwani, hockey player
 Tahir Iqbal Chaudhry (MNA Vehari)
 Tehmina Daultana (MNA Vehari)
 Waseem Ahmad (Former Captain, Pakistan Hockey Team)
 Mian Muhammad Saqib Khurshid (MPA Vehari)

References

External links

 
Populated places in Vehari District